In Greek mythology, Alciope may refer to the three different characters:

 Alciope, the nymph-mother Celmisius. In this capacity, she was probably the Alciope who bore to Cronus the Dactyls, one of which Celmis was named.
Alciope, one of Apollo's lovers whom she bore him Linus.
 Alciope, the supposed name of Alciopus' daughter. She was one of Heracles's numerous lovers.

References 

Nymphs
Women of Apollo
Women of Heracles